Reef Doctors is an Australian television drama series that premiered on Network Ten on 9 June 2013.

Premise
The show revolves around Dr. Sam Stewart, the leader of a team of doctors serving the remote Hope Island Clinic. They look after residents of a small island community and neighbouring islands on the Great Barrier Reef, as well as holidaymakers and thrillseekers who visit the area. Sam is a single mother with an unusual interest in venom, hoping to extract the hidden secrets that may have the power to cure fatal diseases.

Pre-production
Reef Doctors is the first non-children's show Jonathan M Shiff has produced. As well as starring in the series, Lisa McCune is a co-producer. Filming commenced on 28 November 2011 in Queensland, around the Great Barrier Reef, and finished in April 2012. The series was due to be broadcast from September 2012, but was pushed back to June 2013.

Ratings and reception

The series received mixed reviews upon its long-overdue premiere.

The first episode finally aired on 9 June 2013 at 6:30pm, attracting low ratings of just 357,000 for Network Ten. These low figures caused Ten to move the show into a different time-slot, on Fridays at 9:30pm, but even that proved to be too much to ask, because it then failed to attract reasonable viewing figures in its changed time-slot. As a result, the show was subsequently moved to Ten's digital channel Eleven (now 10 Peach) from 29 June 2013.

Cast
 Lisa McCune as Dr. Sam Stewart
 Richard Brancatisano as Dr. Rick D'Alessandro
 Rohan Nichol as Toby McGrath
 Susan Hoecke as Freya Klein
 Andrew Ryan as Gus Cochrane
 Tasneem Roc as Olivia Shaw
 Rod Mullinar as Sonny Farrell
 Justin Holborow as Jack Stewart
 Chloe Bayliss as Nell Saunders
 Kristof Piechocki as Malcolm Reid
 Matt Day as Prof. Andrew Walsh
 Alexandra Davies as Gillian

Episodes

Home media

References

External links
Reef Doctors at the Australian Television Information Archive

Network 10 original programming
10 Peach original programming
Australian drama television series
2013 Australian television series debuts
2013 Australian television series endings
Television shows set in Queensland
English-language television shows